The following is a timeline of the history of the city of Kaliningrad, Russia.The city was known as Königsberg Prior to 1945 and Twangste prior to 1255.

Era of Teutonic Order

 1255 – Fortress built by Teutonic Knights during Prussian Crusade, on the basis of a Prussian settlement Twangste.
 1256 – Settlement formed north of the fortress.
 1262 – Prussians begin to besiege castle during the Great Prussian Uprising.
 1264 – Settlement developed south of the castle.
 1286 – Königsberg chartered.
 1300 – Town of Löbenicht built.
 1324 – Town of Kneiphof founded.
 1333 - Construction of Königsberg Cathedral begins.
 1340 – Königsberg joins Hanseatic League.
 1377 – Köttelbrücke (bridge) built.
 1379 (or 1397) – Schmiedebrücke (bridge) built.
 1380 – Cathedral built in Kneiphof (approximate date).
 1387 – Kneiphof Town Hall renovated.

15th century
 1440 – The city becomes a founding member of the anti-Teutonic Prussian Confederation.
 1454
 March: Inclusion of the city, in Polish known as Królewiec, within the borders of the Kingdom of Poland following a request of the Prussian Confederation.
 March: The local mayor pledged allegiance to the Polish King during the incorporation of the region in Kraków.
 March: City authorized by the Polish king to mint Polish coins.
 April: City becomes the capital of the Królewiec Voivodeship within Poland.
 1455 – Captured by Teutonic Knights during the Thirteen Years' War.
 1457 – City becomes capital of the State of the Teutonic Order.
 1464 – Georg Steinhaupt becomes mayor.
 1465 – Landing force from Polish-allied Elbląg destroyed the shipyard near the Old Town, preventing the Teutonic Knights from rebuilding their fleet until the end of the Thirteen Years' War.
 1466 – Second Treaty of Thorn: the city becomes a part of Poland as a fief held by the Teutonic Order.

16th century
 1519–21 – Polish-Teutonic War. The city opposed the Teutonic Knights' war against Poland and demanded peace.
 1520 – Mikolaj Firlej lays siege to the town
 1521–24 – Secularization of the Teutonic Order
 1523 – Printing press in operation.
 1525 – Treaty of Kraków: Königsberg/Królewiec becomes the capital of the Duchy of Prussia, Albert becomes first Duke of Prussia as a vassal of Poland. Treaty confirmed by city representatives.
 1529 – Castle Library established
 1542 – Pedagogium founded by Albert Hohenzollern in Kneiphof
 1544 – Albertina University (Lutheran) founded by Albert, Duke of Prussia.
 1545 – Oldest Polish catechism published by Jan Seklucjan.
 1547 – Catechism of Martynas Mažvydas published.
 1550 – Population: 14,000.
 1553 – Oldest Polish translation of the New Testament, by Stanisław Murzynowski, published.
 1560 – 28 March: King Sigismund II Augustus of Poland confers university privileges on the Albertina University, on a par with the Jagiellonian University.
 1566
 Duke Albert attempted to introduce absolutist rule in violation of the Treaty of Kraków.
 August–October: Stay and intervention of Polish Royal commissioners, restoration of the previous legal order.
 4 October: Decree expanding the rights of Polish rulers and of the nobility and cities in the duchy.
 22 October: Decree settling the city's conflict with Duke Albert, instituted by Polish Royal commissioners.
 1568 – March: Albert Frederick becomes Duke of Prussia.
 1577 – City opposes the regency of George Frederick, Margrave of Brandenburg-Ansbach.
 1579 – Renewed city resistance to the regency of George Frederick. The city supports the nobility's request to the Polish King to send a Polish Royal Commission to the city.
 1580 – Arrival of George Frederick to establish his rule.
 1590 – Green Bridge rebuilt.
 1594 – Schlosskirche (castle church) dedicated

17th century
 1616 – A Catholic church erected by order of King Sigismund III Vasa and the bishop of Warmia 
 1618 – Duchy of Prussia passes under control of Electors of Brandenburg, August: John Sigismund becomes Duke of Prussia
 1619 – December: George William becomes Duke of Prussia
 1626 – City walls built.
 1629 – City refuses to pay taxes to the duchy.
 1632 – King Władysław IV Vasa of Poland supports the city in its dispute with Duke George William.
 1635
 January: Agreement between the King of Poland and the city, granting the city the right to organize its military defense against a possible Swedish attack in exchange for exemption from taxes.
 July: Visit of King Władysław IV Vasa.
 July: Jerzy Ossoliński appointed the Polish governor of the duchy by King Władysław IV Vasa.
 Jerzy Ossoliński completes the fortification of the city against a potential Swedish attack.
 1636 – Visit of King Władysław IV Vasa.
 1640 – December: Frederick William becomes Duke of Prussia
 1647 – Neurossgarten Church dedicated
 1657
 Brandenburg Gate built.
 Fort Friedrichsburg under construction
 City opposes the rule of Elector Frederick William, and sides with Poland.
 1662
 City sends a letter to King John II Casimir Vasa of Poland, opposing the rule of Elector Frederick William.
 8 July: Confederation formed in the city to maintain Poland's sovereignty over the city and region.
 27 October: The Brandenburg Elector and his army enter the city.
 30 October: Hieronymus Roth, leader of the city's anti-Elector opposition, abducted by Brandenburg forces, and then imprisoned.
 1663 – City burghers, forced by Frederick William, swear an oath of allegiance to him, however, in the same ceremony they still also pledge alliegiance to Poland.
 1688 – April: Frederick becomes Duke of Prussia.

18th century
 1701
 18 January: Coronation of Frederick I of Prussia in the Schlosskirche.
 Capital of Duchy of Prussia relocated from Königsberg to Berlin.
 1709 – Plague.
 1718
 City Library opens.
 Poczta Królewiecka Polish-language newspaper begins publication (ceased in 1720).
 1724
 22 April: Birth of Immanuel Kant, philosopher.
 June: City of Königsberg expanded by uniting Altstadt, Kneiphof, and Löbenicht.
 Königsberg City Archive is located in the Town Hall (approximate date).
 1735 – Math problem "Seven Bridges of Königsberg" presented.
 1756 – Synagogue built.
 1758
 16 January: Russian forces enter city.
 24 January: City becomes part of Russia.
 1764 – Russian occupation ends.
 1765 – Gumbinnen Gate built.
 1780 – Theodor Gottlieb von Hippel becomes mayor.
 1790 – Königshalle built.

19th century
 1804 – 12 February: Death of Immanuel Kant, philosopher.
 1807 – French in power.
 1809 – Paradeplatz city garden established.

 1810 – August Wilhelm Heidemann becomes mayor.
 1812 – School of church music founded.
 1813 – Koenigsberg Observatory built.
 1814 – Carl Friedrich Horn becomes mayor.
 1826 – Johann Friedrich List becomes mayor.
 1828 – Royal and University Library formed.
 1830 – Population: 54,000.
 1831 – Polish poet Wincenty Pol interned in the city following the unsuccessful Polish November Uprising. He wrote his first poems there.
 1833 – University's Department of Chemistry opens in Neurossgarten.
 1838 – Rudolf von Auerswald becomes mayor.
 1845
 Union Giesserei foundry in business.
 New Altstadt Church dedicated.
 Art academy opens.
 1851 – Grolman Bastion built.
 1855
 Sailing Club founded.
 Rossgarten Gate rebuilt.
 1856 – Königsberg Cathedral restored.
 1858 – Dohna Tower built.
 1860 – Astronomic Bastion built.
 1861
 18 October: Coronation of William I, German Emperor, in the Schlosskirche.
 Albertina University new campus dedicated.
 1863–1864 – Arms trafficking for Polish insurgents during the January Uprising in the Russian Partition of Poland, co-organized by Wojciech Kętrzyński.
 1867 – Population: 101,507.
 1875
 Johann Karl Adolf Selke becomes mayor.
 Königsberg Stock Exchange built in Vorstadt.
 1878 – Königsberger Allgemeine Zeitung (newspaper) in publication.
 1880
 Bronsart Fort built.
 Population: 140,800.
 1883 – High Bridge rebuilt.
 1886 – Siemering Museum established.
 1889 – Eisenbahnbrücke (bridge) opens.

 1890 – Population: 161,666.
 1892 – Baltika Stadium opens.
 1893 – Hermann Theodor Hoffmann becomes mayor.
 1896 – Zoo founded.
 1897 – Königsberger Tageblatt (newspaper) in publication.
 1898 – Palaestra Albertina established.
 1900
 Football Club Königsberg formed.
 Population: 187,897.

20th century

1900-1945
 1901
 Queen Louise Memorial Church and Pillau-Königsberg canal built.
  (newspaper) in publication.
 1903 – Siegfried Körte becomes mayor.
 1905 - Population: 219,862.
 1906 – Bismarck tower built near city.
 1907 – Church of the Holy Family built.
 1912 – Stadthalle opens.
 1913
 New Tragheim Church dedicated.
 Kunsthalle Königsberg (art gallery) opens.
 1914 – City bombed by Russian forces.
 1919
 Hans Lohmeyer becomes mayor.
 City becomes part of the German Reich.
 Population: 260,895.
 1921 – Königsberg Devau Airport opens.

 1927 – City Hall relocated to Hansaplatz.
 1928 – Königsberg City Museum opens.
 1929 – Central railway terminal opens.
 1931 – Last Polish book in the pre-1945 city published.
 1933 – Hellmuth Will becomes mayor.
 1934 – Hansaplatz renamed Adolf-Hitler-Platz.
 1939
 Lasch Bunker built in Paradeplatz.
 Population: 368,433.
 25 August: The local Gestapo issued an arrest warrant for all Polish teachers in the region.
 August–September: Persecution of Poles, incl. mass arrests of Polish students and arrests of local Polish consul Jerzy Warchełowski and attaché Witold Winiarski.
 October: The Germans established a forced labour camp for Romani people.
 1941 – 1 September: Aerial bombing by Soviet forces begins.
 1942 – 24 June: The Nazi SS sends the first deportation of Jews from Königsberg and the province of East Prussia to extermination camps.
 1944
 August: Aerial bombing by British forces; city extensively damaged.
 19 August: The Germans established a subcamp of the Stutthof concentration camp, in which around 500 Jews were subjected to forced labour.
 1945
 January: Subcamp of the Stutthof concentration camp dissolved.
 January: Battle of Königsberg begins.
 February: Metgethen massacre.
 9 April: Battle of Königsberg ends; Soviets in power.

1946-1990s
 1946
 April: City becomes part of the Russian Soviet Federative Socialist Republic, per Potsdam Agreement.
 City renamed Kaliningrad after Bolshevik Mikhail Kalinin.
 City becomes seat of the newly formed Kaliningrad Oblast.
 Kaliningrad Regional Museum of History and Arts founded.
 Kaliningradskaya Pravda newspaper begins publication.
 1947 – Kaliningrad Regional Drama Theatre established.
 1954 – Pishchevik Kaliningrad football club formed.
 1956 – Population: 188,000.

 1960 – Theatre on Mira Avenue rebuilt.
 1965 - Population: 253,000.
 1967 – Kaliningrad State University active.
 1979
 Khrabrovo Airport terminal built.
 Kaliningrad Amber Museum opens.
 1985 - Population: 385,000.
 1988 – Kaliningrad State Art Gallery established.
 1989 – Population: 401,280; oblast 871,283.
 1990
 Chamber of Commerce founded.
 City opens to foreign tourists.
 1994 – Kaliningrad State Technical University active.
 1996 – Leonid Gorbenko becomes governor of Kaliningrad Oblast.
 1998 – The Voice from the Pregel Polish-language magazine in publication.

21st century

 2001 – Vladimir Yegorov becomes governor of Kaliningrad Oblast.
 2005
 July: 750th anniversary of city founding.
 Kaiser Bridge reconstructed (approximate date).
 Georgy Boos becomes governor of Kaliningrad Oblast.
 2007
 Alexander Jaroschuk becomes mayor.
 Khrabrovo Airport new terminal opens.
 2008 – Cathedral of Christ the Saviour consecrated.
 2010
 30 January: Protest against governor Georgy Boos.
 Population: 431,500; oblast 941,873.
 Nikolay Tsukanov becomes governor of Kaliningrad Oblast.
 2012 – Poland-Russia border near Kaliningrad Oblast opens.

See also
 History of Kaliningrad
 Königsberg
 List of monarchs of Prussia, 1525-1701
 Timelines of other cities in the Northwestern Federal District of Russia: Pskov, St. Petersburg

References

This article incorporates information from the German Wikipedia and Russian Wikipedia.

Bibliography

in English
Published in the 18th-19th century
 
 
 
 
 
 
  
 
 
 

Published in the 20th century
 
 
 
 

Published in the 21st century

in other languages
 
 
 
  (bibliography)

External links

 Europeana. Items related to Kaliningrad, various dates.
 Digital Public Library of America. Items related to Kaliningrad, various dates
 Links to fulltext city directories for Konigsberg via Wikisource

Years in Russia
Kaliningrad
Königsberg
Kaliningrad